Oblivion is the seventh full-length album by American post-grunge band Smile Empty Soul. The album was released on May 25, 2018. It is the first and only album with new bassist Mark Young and drummer Victor Ribas.  The singles from the album include "Sides" and "Stars", "Stars" is scheduled to have a music video released the same day of the single release. The music video for "Stars" premiered live on Alternative Press's Facebook Live on 4/13/18 as scheduled.

Track listing

Personnel
Smile Empty Soul
Sean Danielsen - lead vocals, lead & rhythm guitars, piano and bass guitar*
Mark Young – bass guitar
Victor Ribas – drums, backing vocals

References

2018 albums
Smile Empty Soul albums